is a former Japanese football player.

Playing career
Kaburagi was born in Omitama on April 18, 1976. After graduating from Kokushikan University, he joined the newly promoted J2 League club FC Tokyo in 1999. He played many matches as forward and left side midfielder during the first season. The club won second place and was promoted to the J1 League in 2000. However, his playing time decreased. In 2002, he moved to the J2 club Albirex Niigata, but he did not play often and left the club end in 2002. After a year and nine months, he joined the Regional Leagues club Matsumoto Yamaga FC in October 2004 and played until the end of the season. In May 2005, he joined Matsumoto Yamaga FC again and played until the end of that season.

Club statistics

References

External links

1976 births
Living people
Kokushikan University alumni
Association football people from Ibaraki Prefecture
Japanese footballers
J1 League players
J2 League players
FC Tokyo players
Albirex Niigata players
Matsumoto Yamaga FC players
Association football forwards